Cesar or Caesar Martinez may refer to:

César Martínez (artist) (born 1944), Chicano artist
César Martínez (footballer, born 1986), Paraguayan football midfielder
César Martínez (footballer, born 1995), Mexican football midfielder
César Martínez, a character in Mujeres engañadas
Caesar Martinez (The Walking Dead), a character in The Walking Dead